Mosque Ould Abas is a mosque in Nouakchott, Mauritania. It is located between Marche de La Viande and Marche Capitale, southwest of Mosque Saudique.

See also
 Islam in Mauritania

References

Mosques in Mauritania
Buildings and structures in Nouakchott